US Post Office–Middleburgh is a historic post office building located at Middleburgh in Schoharie County, New York, United States. It was designed and built 1939–1940, and is one of a number of post offices in New York State designed by the Office of the Supervising Architect of the Treasury Department under Louis A. Simon.  The building is in the Colonial Revival style and is a one-story, five bay, steel frame structure on a raised concrete foundation.  The interior features a 1941 mural by Mary Earley titled "Dance of the Hop Pickers."

It was listed on the National Register of Historic Places in 1989.

References

Middleburgh
Colonial Revival architecture in New York (state)
Government buildings completed in 1940
Buildings and structures in Schoharie County, New York
National Register of Historic Places in Schoharie County, New York